Respawn Entertainment, LLC is an American video game development studio founded in 2010 by Jason West and Vince Zampella and owned by Electronic Arts since 2017. West and Zampella previously co-founded Infinity Ward and created the Call of Duty franchise, where they were responsible for its development until 2010.

Respawn's first game, the first-person shooter Titanfall, was released in 2014. On December 1, 2017, the studio was acquired by EA. Its first game since the acquisition was the free-to-play Apex Legends, released on February 1, 2019, followed by Star Wars Jedi: Fallen Order, released in November of that year. Respawn developed Medal of Honor: Above and Beyond, which included in its bonus features the Academy Award-winning short documentary Colette.

History 
Jason West and Vince Zampella had been leads at Infinity Ward, a subsidiary of Activision founded in 2002. Infinity Ward was a principal studio on the Call of Duty series, and in 2007, released Call of Duty 4: Modern Warfare, a critical success for the series. West and Zampella leveraged the success of Modern Warfare to renegotiate their contracts with Activision in 2008, asking for large bonuses and creative control of the series in exchange for releasing Call of Duty: Modern Warfare 2 in 2009, which Activision agreed to on the condition that the control would revert to Activision if the pair were fired. From that point, Activision sought ways to trigger that clause, and West and Zampella looked for ways to make Infinity Ward independent. Events came to a head in March 2010 when the two were fired from Activision, forfeiting their bonuses. Several lawsuits followed, with West and Zampella accusing Activision of unpaid bonuses while Activision countersued that the two had conspired with Electronic Arts (EA) to damage Infinity Ward, but these suits were ultimately settled out of court.

In April 2010, a month after their release from Activision, West and Zampella set off to form a new independent studio, Respawn Entertainment. They sought funding from EA through the EA Partners Program. West and Zampella will retain the rights to all intellectual property produced by them in the future. As of July 10, 2010, 38 of the 46 Infinity Ward employees who resigned from that studio following the firings of West and Zampella revealed through their LinkedIn and Facebook profiles that they had signed on with Respawn Entertainment.

EA Games Label president Frank Gibeau revealed at E3 2011 in June 2011 that Respawn Entertainment's EA-published shooter was "sci-fi oriented" and would allow the publisher to "compete with things like Gears and Halo". Gibeau also stated that EA would release Respawn's project when it saw an "opportunistic" window. Later that month, Respawn released a blurry teaser image of its unannounced game via the official website launched that day. Respawn further released another blurry image, and teased the new game with mo-cap shot. In April 2013, Respawn registered a trademark for the name Titan, and it was reported that Respawn's game was an always-online Xbox exclusive, although nothing had been confirmed.

In June 2013, Respawn Entertainment debuted Titanfall at E3. On October 22 they revealed the release date of the game to be March 11, 2014, in North America, and March 13 in Europe. In March 2015, it was announced that Respawn was developing a sequel, Titanfall 2, which was later released on October 28, 2016.

In June 2014, it was announced that Stig Asmussen, who previously worked for Santa Monica Studio on the God of War series, had joined the studio as game director of a second project that had nothing to do with Titanfall. From job listings in January 2016, it was found that the project was to be a third person action-adventure game. On May 4, 2016 – Star Wars Day – Asmussen announced Respawn Entertainment was making a third-person Star Wars game, later revealed to be Star Wars Jedi: Fallen Order at E3 2018.

In October 2017, it was announced that Respawn Entertainment was developing a virtual reality first person shooter title for the Oculus Rift, which was formally revealed as Medal of Honor: Above and Beyond in September 2019.

The acquisition was completed on December 1, 2017.

In February 2019, Respawn Entertainment debuted Apex Legends via YouTube livestream. This debut had no prior announcement or marketing. The game was released the same day as the livestream on February 4, 2019.

On its tenth anniversary, Respawn announced it was opening a new studio in Vancouver, British Columbia, to focus on ongoing development of Apex Legends. The studio is located on the EA Vancouver campus as to be able to tap into their resources.

On January 25, 2022, it was announced that Respawn was developing a sequel to Jedi Fallen Order alongside an original Star Wars FPS and a strategy game. Peter Hirshmann will direct the FPS and Bit Reactor will co-develop the strategy game.

On March 20, 2023, Respawn announced they were opening a third studio to keep Apex Legends going for '10 to 15 years, this time in Madison, Wisconsin with Call of Duty veteran Ryan Burnett to lead the company in that branch. Prior to his previous position at Epic Games as director of engine production, Burnett spent 14 years at Call of Duty studio Raven Software – just one of the major studios based in the area.

Colette 
Colette is a 24-minute short film directed by Anthony Giacchino that was produced for inclusion in Medal of Honor: Above and Beyond as an installment in its Gallery series of short documentaries. The film follows former French Resistance member Colette Marin-Catherine as she travels to Germany for the first time in 74 years to visit the Mittelbau-Dora concentration camp where her brother died at the hands of the Nazis.

Of the Gallery shorts, Colette garnered particular recognition for its cinematic value. Respawn and Oculus submitted it to various film festivals, including the Big Sky Documentary Film Festival where it won the award for Best Short, making it eligible for submission to the American Academy of Motion Picture Arts and Sciences for awards consideration. Subsequently, Colette was nominated for and  won the Academy Award for Best Documentary Short Subject at the 93rd Academy Awards, making the short the first production by a video game company to win an Oscar.

Games developed

Notes

References

External links
 

 
2010 establishments in California
2017 mergers and acquisitions
American companies established in 2010
Companies based in Los Angeles
Electronic Arts
Video game companies established in 2010
Video game development companies